Qeshlaq-e Pust Shuran (also Romanized as Qeshlāq-e Pūst Shūrān; also known as Qeshlāq and Qeshlāq-e Pūsteh Shūrān) is a village in Miyan Rud Rural District, Qolqol Rud District, Tuyserkan County, Hamadan Province, Iran. At the 2006 census, its population was 210, in 44 families.

References 

Populated places in Tuyserkan County